Anastasia Prokopenko (born 17 May 1986) is a Russian badminton player. She competed for Russia at the 2012 Summer Olympics in the women's singles event.

Achievements

BWF International Challenge/Series
Women's singles

Women's doubles

Mixed doubles

 BWF International Challenge tournament
 BWF International Series tournament
 BWF Future Series tournament

References

External links
 

Russian female badminton players
Olympic badminton players of Russia
Badminton players at the 2012 Summer Olympics
1986 births
Living people
Sportspeople from Krasnoyarsk
21st-century Russian women